Leech–Lloyd Farmhouse and Barn Complex is a historic home located at Lima in Livingston County, New York. The farmhouse was built about 1800 and is a two-story, five bay frame residence dating to the settlement period. The barn complex was demolished in May 1989.

It was listed on the National Register of Historic Places in 1989.

References

Houses on the National Register of Historic Places in New York (state)
Houses completed in 1800
Houses in Livingston County, New York
National Register of Historic Places in Livingston County, New York